Malcolm Miller (born March 6, 1993) is an American professional basketball player for Limoges CSP of the LNB Pro A. He played college basketball for the Holy Cross Crusaders.

Miller has played in the NBA for the Toronto Raptors, whom he won a championship with in 2019.

High school career
Miller attended Gaithersburg High School where he served as team captain during both his junior and senior seasons, averaging 13.1 points, 7.5 rebounds, 2.8 assists, 2.6 blocks and 1.4 steals per game as a senior, earning him first team All-Gazette honors.

College career
In four years at Holy Cross, Miller totaled 1,013 points, 532 rebounds, 164 assists, 143 blocked shots and 93 steals, ranking third all-time in career blocked shots and sixth in career games started (93).

As a senior, Miller averaged 14.5 points, 4.9 rebounds, 1.6 blocked shots, 1.3 steals and 1.2 assists per game for the Crusaders, while connecting on 37.2 percent of his three-point field goal attempts and 83.0 percent of his free throws. He finished the season ranked second in the Patriot League in blocked shots, fourth in free throw percentage, seventh in steals, eighth in scoring, 14th in three-point field goals made and 15th in rebounding. Miller led the team in scoring 13 times and in rebounding 13 times that year, while scoring in double-figures 25 times.

Professional career

Maine Red Claws (2015–2016)
After going undrafted on the 2015 NBA draft, Miller joined the Boston Celtics for the 2015 NBA Summer League where he averaged 4.0 points and 1.3 rebounds in 12.1 minutes per game. On September 25, 2015, he signed with the Celtics. However, he was later waived by the Celtics on October 20 after appearing in one preseason game. On October 31, he was acquired by the Maine Red Claws of the NBA Development League as an affiliate player of the Celtics.

Alba Berlin (2016–2017)
On July 27, 2016, Miller signed with Alba Berlin of the German Bundesliga and EuroCup.

Toronto Raptors (2017–2020)
For the 2017–18 season, Miller signed with the Toronto Raptors of the NBA as the team's first two-way contract recipient. He would spend most of the season with the Raptors' G-League affiliate Raptors 905. Miller would play in 15 NBA regular season games for the Raptors, starting four times. He made his first career NBA start on March 4, 2018, against the Charlotte Hornets.

On February 10, 2019, Miller re-signed with the Toronto Raptors as a part of the main roster. That season, Miller played in 10 playoff games and won a championship with Raptors after they defeated the Golden State Warriors in the 2019 NBA Finals.

In the 2019-20 season, Miller played in 28 games for the Raptors, starting once.

Salt Lake City Stars (2021)
On December 18, 2020, Miller signed a contract with the Utah Jazz. He was waived at the conclusion of training camp, but was later added to the roster of their G League affiliate, the Salt Lake City Stars.

Vanoli Cremona (2021–2022)
On August 29, 2021, Miller signed with Vanoli Cremona of the Italian Lega Basket Serie A (LBA). After averaging 9.3 points per game, he parted ways with the team on January 24, 2022.

Return to the 905 (2022–2023)
On December 15, 2022, Miller was traded from the Salt Lake City Stars to the Raptors 905.

Limoges CSP (2023–present)
On January 19, 2023, he signed with Limoges CSP of the LNB Pro A.

Career statistics

NBA

Regular season

|-
| style="text-align:left;"| 
| style="text-align:left;"| Toronto
| 15 || 4 || 8.4 || .464 || .381 || 1.000 || 1.0 || .2 || .1 || .1 || 2.5
|-
| style="text-align:left; background:#afe6ba;"|†
| style="text-align:left;"| Toronto
| 10 || 0 || 6.7 || .423 || .476 || .750 || .5 || .1 || .1 || .1 || 3.5
|-
| style="text-align:left;"| 
| style="text-align:left;"| Toronto
| 28 || 1 || 5.8 || .414 || .364 || .375 || .6 || .4 || .2 || .1 || 1.3
|- class="sortbottom"
| style="text-align:center;" colspan="2"| Career
| 53 || 5 || 6.7 || .434 || .406 || .625 || .7 || .3 || .1 || .1 || 2.0

Playoffs

|-
| style="text-align:left; background:#afe6ba;"|2019†
| style="text-align:left;"|Toronto
| 10 || 0 || 2.8 || .250 || .167 || .750 || .5 || .1 || .0 || .1 || .8
|-
| style="text-align:left;"|2020
| style="text-align:left;"|Toronto
| 1 || 0 || 5.0 || .333 || 1.000 || .0 || .0 || .0 || .0 || .0 || 3.0
|- class="sortbottom"
| style="text-align:center;" colspan="2"|Career
| 11 || 0 || 3.0 || .273 || .286 || .750 || .5 || .1 || .0 || .1 || 1.0

Personal life
The son of Robert and Sheila Miller, he has one brother and two sisters. His sister, Janell Thomas, played basketball at North Carolina Central. In June 2021 Miller married his longtime girlfriend, Dana, and in October 2021 they welcomed a daughter.

References

External links

 Holy Cross Crusaders bio
 RealGM profile
 USBasket profile
 Sports-Reference profile

1993 births
Living people
21st-century African-American sportspeople
African-American basketball players
Alba Berlin players
American expatriate basketball people in Canada
American expatriate basketball people in Germany
American men's basketball players
Basketball players from Maryland
Gaithersburg High School alumni
Holy Cross Crusaders men's basketball players
Limoges CSP players
Maine Red Claws players
People from Gaithersburg, Maryland
Raptors 905 players
Salt Lake City Stars players
Small forwards
Toronto Raptors players
Undrafted National Basketball Association players
Vanoli Cremona players